Pilonidal disease is a type of skin infection which typically occurs as a cyst between the cheeks of the buttocks and often at the upper end. Symptoms may include pain, swelling, and redness. There may also be drainage of fluid, but rarely a fever.

Risk factors include obesity, family history, prolonged sitting, greater amounts of hair, and not enough exercise. The underlying mechanism is believed to involve a mechanical process. The lesions may contain hair and skin debris. Diagnosis is based on symptoms and examination.

If there is infection, treatment is generally by incision and drainage just off the midline. Shaving the area and laser hair removal may prevent recurrence. More extensive surgery may be required if the disease recurs. Antibiotics are usually not needed. Without treatment the condition may remain long term.

About 3 per 10,000 people per year are affected, and it occurs more often in males than females. Young adults are most commonly affected. The term "pilonidal" means "nest of hair". The condition was first described in 1833.

Signs and symptoms

Pilonidal cysts are itchy and often very painful, and typically occur between the ages of 15 and 35.  Although usually found near the coccyx, the condition can also affect the navel, armpit, the cheek, or the genital region, though these locations are much rarer.

Signs and symptoms may include:

Intermittent pain/discomfort or swelling above the anus or near the tailbone
Opaque yellow (purulent) or bloody discharge from the tailbone area
Unexpected moisture in the tailbone region
Discomfort sitting on the tailbone, doing sit-ups or riding a bicycle—any activities that roll over the tailbone area

Some people with a pilonidal cyst will be asymptomatic.

Pilonidal sinus 

Pilonidal sinus (PNS): is a sinus tract, or small channel, that may originate from the source of infection and open to the surface of the skin. Material from the cyst drains through the pilonidal sinus.  A pilonidal cyst is usually painful, but with draining the patient might not feel pain.

Causes 

One proposed cause of pilonidal cysts is ingrown hair, although hairs found in pilonidal sinus tracts may originate from the head. Excessive sitting is thought to predispose people to the condition, as sitting increases pressure on the coccygeal region. Trauma is not believed to cause a pilonidal cyst; however, such an event may result in inflammation of an existing cyst; there are cases where this can occur months after a localized injury to the area. Pilonidal cysts may be caused by a congenital pilonidal dimple. Excessive sweating can also contribute to the formation of a pilonidal cyst: moisture can fill a stretched hair follicle, which helps create a low-oxygen environment that promotes the growth of anaerobic bacteria, often found in pilonidal cysts. The presence of bacteria and low oxygen levels hamper wound healing and exacerbate a forming pilonidal cyst.

Differential diagnosis

A pilonidal cyst can resemble a dermoid cyst, a kind of teratoma (germ cell tumor).  In particular, a pilonidal cyst in the gluteal cleft can resemble a sacrococcygeal teratoma.  Correct diagnosis is important because all teratomas require consultation with an oncologist and complete surgical excision, if possible without any spillage.

Treatment 
If there is infection, treatment is generally by incision and drainage just off the midline. Following five simple rules has been known to prevent recurring inflammations for some people and avoid the surgery: 1. Avoiding chairs and car seats that put pressure on coccyx; 2. Being of average weight, preferably with low BMI; 3. Keeping the area clean; 4. Keeping the area dry by wearing exclusively cotton garments; 5. Keeping the area completely hair free, for example by regularly using an IPL hair removal device.

The evidence for elective treatment of pilonidal sinus disease is poor. The most commonly performed surgery is for the pilonidal sinus complex to be surgically excised with the wound often left open to heal. Post-surgical wound packing may be necessary, and packing typically must be replaced daily for 4 to 8 weeks. In some cases, two years may be required for complete granulation to occur.  Sometimes the cyst is resolved via surgical marsupialization.

Surgeons can also excise the sinus and repair with a reconstructive flap technique, such as a "cleft lift" procedure or Z-plasty, usually done under general anesthetic. This approach is especially useful for complicated or recurring pilonidal disease, leaves little scar tissue and flattens the region between the buttocks, reducing the risk of recurrence.  This approach typically results in a more rapid recovery than the traditional surgery, however there are fewer surgeons trained in the cleft lift procedure and it consequently may not be as accessible to patients, depending on their location. Meta-analysis shows recurrence rates were lower in open healing than with primary closure (RR 0.60, 95% CI 0.42 to 0.87), at the expense of healing time. Pilonidal cysts can recur, and do so more frequently if the surgical wound is sutured in the midline, as opposed to away from the midline, which obliterates the natal cleft and removes the focus of shearing stress. An incision lateral to the intergluteal cleft is therefore preferred, especially given the poor healing of midline incisions in this region. Minimally invasive techniques with no wound and rapid return to full activities have been reported but await double blind randomised trials.

Another technique is to treat pilonidal sinus with fibrin glue. This technique is of unclear benefit as of 2017 due to insufficient research. The evidence for any treatment is of low quality, and care must be taken not to over interpret any study in this field.

In some cases wounds are left open after surgery to heal naturally instead of being closed with stitches. There are a lot of different dressings and topical agents (creams or lotions) that are available for helping these open wounds to heal. A 2022 systematic review brought together evidence from 11 studies that compared dressings and topical agents for treating open wounds after surgical treatment for pilonidal sinus of the buttocks. The authors concluded that: platelet rich plasma may help wounds to heal quicker compared to sterile gauze; Lietofax skin repair cream may help wounds to heal by 30 days compared to iodine (which helps to reduce bacteria in the wound); but it is not clear whether hydrogel dressings (designed to keep the wound moist) reduce the time it takes wounds to heal compared with cleaning the wound with iodine.

Etymology 

Pilonidal means nest of hair and is derived from the Latin words for hair (pilus) and nest (nidus). The condition was first described by Herbert Mayo in 1833. R.M. Hodges was the first to use the phrase pilonidal cyst to describe the condition in 1880.

The condition was widespread in the United States Army during World War II.  The condition was termed "Jeep seat" or "Jeep riders' disease", because a large portion of people who were being hospitalized for it rode in Jeeps, and prolonged rides in the bumpy vehicles were believed to have caused the condition due to irritation and pressure on the coccyx.

References

External links 

 NHS Choices for pilonidal sinus treatment

Buttocks
Cysts
Wikipedia medicine articles ready to translate